All the Best is a 2012 compilation album series of 2CD albums by EMI Records Germany featuring EMI and Virgin artists. Many of the artists had already been covered in a 1CD EMI compilation series as Essential in 2011. Others, particularly for the German artists, were new compilations, and listed on artist websites. 

The compilations' choice of music reflected what had been popular in Germany, causing Allmusic's reviewer to criticize the All the Best - UB40 issue in the series with the conclusion "All the Best really means All the Non-Political Best".

Issues
 All the Best Edith Piaf
 All the Best Hot Chocolate
 All the Best The Shadows
 All the Best Suzi Quatro
 All the Best The Stranglers
 All the Best The Human League
 All the Best Culture Club
 All the Best Jethro Tull
 All the Best Dr. Hook
 All the Best Runrig
 All the Best Shirley Bassey
 All the Best UB40
 All the Best The Hollies
 All the Best Gary Moore
 All the Best Sinead O'Connor
 All the Best Crowded House
 All the Best The Dubliners
 All the Best Eddie Cochrane
 All the Best Ten Years After
 All the Best Gerry and the Pacemakers
 All the Best The Ramones

Continental Europe artists 
 All the Best Andreas Martin
 All the Best Bernhard Brink
 All the Best Tom Astor
 All the Best Michelle
 All the Best Claudia Jung
 All the Best Maria & Margot Hellwig
 All the Best Fernando Express
 All the Best Adamo
 All the Best Howard Carpendale
 All the Best Nicki
 All the Best Christian Anders
 All the Best Matthias Reim
 All the Best Captain Cook und seine singenden Saxophone

References

2012 compilation albums
Compilation album series